The Tosa Obake Zōshi is a Japanese yōkai emaki. Set in the Tosa Province (now Kōchi Prefecture), and 16 sections about yōkai in total, its creation period has been determined to be from the Edo period. Its author is unknown. There are two kinds, the private collection, and the collection of the Sakawa Education Committee of Sakawa, Kōchi Prefecture.

Summary
At the opening of all sixteen yōkai tales, yōkai from each area of Japan gather at Tosa, and in the end, at dawn, the yōkai disperse and bring the scene to a conclusion. The yōkai are presented with a rich local colouring but it is a work that has attracted deep interest as an iconization of the yōkai tales of those times. The depictions present the yōkai in an aspect of mischievous naivety and playfulness, allowing the reader to feel close to the yōkai rather than showing their dreadfulness. The fact that it takes in folktales told in Tosa in the Edo period like the Kechibi and the Yamajijii among others is another characteristic that is brought up.

In the private collection, it can be seen that they were composed from the middle of the Edo period to late Edo period. According to the postscript written when the end leaves were repaired after the war, the head karō of Tosa, the comber of the Fukao family, received this work from Masanari Eisuke the 3rd from the Yoshimoto family who worked for them for years since in Kan'en 2 (1749), and the sixth daughter of the Takehira family brought it into the family she married into, and from Heisei onwards, it has been passed down in that family.る According to the postscript, it was used by a young lord for staying over the night, and the author is seen not as a famous artist of yōkai and yūrei and so on, but rather a nameless artist who lived in the countryside.

At the same time, the works of the Sawaka Education Committee collection were, according to the statements in the end of the book, made in Ansei 6 (1859). It is roughly the same as the private collection and the yōkai tales stated earlier, and thus hinting that this emaki was drawn in succession at that place, or was drawn as a copy of the private collection. However, it can be seen that the sequence of tales, and the characteristics of the yōkai are different, so it cannot be said to simply be a reproduction, and the chronology the owners of the Sawaka Education Committee collection is also unclear, so how the book was drawn and passed down still awaits further research.

Notes

References
 
 

Works of unknown authorship
Yōkai
Emakimono